Ernest Seyd (March 7, 1830 – May 1, 1881), a German-born British author, banker, and economist, particularly known for his expertise in coinage and foreign exchange, and for his advocacy of bimetallism.

Biography
Ernest Seyd was born at Elberfeld in Prussia. At an early
age he visited the United States, and subsequently went to Paris, and
was present during the revolution of 1848. Returning the next year to Germany, he took an active part in the
revolutionary movement which
resulted in the Frankfurt Parliament and the Frankfurt Constitution.  He was afterwards engaged in banking and exchange
business in Paris, San Francisco, and London. On the adoption of the
gold standard by Germany in 1873, he protested in the strongest manner against the change to a single gold standard, and "foresaw with
wonderful prescience the monetary dislocations that have since taken
place".

Ernest Seyd was also asked by the United States Congress to report on the American Coinage Bill of 1873 then pending.  Seyd's writings on banking, bullion operations, and kindred subjects were well known, and his persistent advocacy of the use of silver as a standard, and his opposition to the policy of demonetisation of that metal, constitute him a leading, if not the principal pioneer of the nineteenth-century "bimetallic" movement in England.

Ernest J. F. Seyd, son of above, was the author of Bi-metallism in 1886 and the Further Fall in Silver and The Silver Question in 1893.

The “Crime of 1873” hoax 
In 1877, a story started circulating that Ernest Seyd, a London banker, had bribed Congress to pass the Coinage Act of 1873, which discontinued the minting of silver dollars. For example, here is how the Ohio Democrat explained the situation to its rival newspaper, the Canton Repository:

Well, Mr. Repository, let us see; here is the “evidence:”

“Congressional Record, 1872, April 9, page 2034, Mr. Hooper, Chairman of the Committee of Coinage, in his reports, states: 'Ernest Seyd, of London, a distinguished writer and bullionist, who is now here and has given great attention to the subject of mints and coinage, after examining the first draft of this bill made various sensible suggestions, which the Committee adopted and embodied in this bill.'
 
In 1872, silver being demonetized in France, Germany, England and Holland, a capital of £100,000 ($500,000) was raised, and Ernest Seyd, of London, was sent to this country with this fund as the agent of the foreign bondholders and capitalists, to effect the same object, which was successful.— Bankers' Magazine, August 1873”

Perhaps our friend of the Repository will question the evidence, if so,
let him turn to the Congressional Record and read for himself.

By 1890, the alleged plot had been termed the “Crime of 1873”. In 1892, the case was bolstered when Frederick A. Luckenbach gave an affidavit that, when Luckenbach had dined with Seyd in 1874, Seyd had told him just that story.  At the time, Luckenbach was selling mining equipment to silver miners in Colorado.  The president of the State Silver League persuaded him to give the affidavit about what Seyd allegedly told him.

Congress finally investigated the story in 1893, twenty years after the alleged crime. It turned out that there was never any such story in Banker's Magazine and that the excerpt from the Congressional Globe (the predecessor to the Congressional Record) had been altered—Hooper did not say that Seyd was “now here” and he did not call him a bullionist. The original read:

Mr. Ernest Seyd, of London, a distinguished writer, who has given great attention to the subject of mints and coinage, after examining the first draft of the bill, furnished many valuable suggestions which have been incorporated in this bill.

Although Seyd and Hooper were long since dead, the letter that Seyd had written to Hooper was found and published. The letter contained page after page of technical recommendations, followed by an impassioned plea for keeping the silver dollar—exactly the opposite of what had been insinuated. Seyd, as it turned out, had been one of the foremost advocates of silver in England, and an expert on bimetallism. Seyd advocated for silver in all his works and had been consulted on the coinage bill because he had written a 250-page book, Suggestions in reference to the metallic currency of the United States. Congressmen distanced themselves from the story and even issued formal apologies for their allegations.

Writers pointed out numerous problems with Luckenbach's affidavit and with the story of the bribery. Perhaps the most glaring question was stated this way, by Hermon Wilson Craven:

The bill dropping the silver dollar from our list of coins had passed the senate on January 10, 1871, by a vote of 36 to 14. It had passed the house on May 27, 1872, by a vote of 110 to 13. In the name of common sense, what need was there for English and German bankers to send Seyd here in the winter of 1872-3, to bribe congress to favor a measure that had already passed both houses of congress without a word of opposition from a single member? Granting that bankers are as willing to resort to bribery as Populists claim—and the word of those who forge government reports would, of course, be accepted as conclusive on this point—they should be credited with having sense enough not to use bribery when there is no necessity whatever for it.

In the end, the allegations of bribery seemed implausible and Luckenbach's affidavit was deemed as phony as the other evidence against Seyd. The “Crime of 1873” ended up as a footnote in the history of the Free Silver movement.

Principal works

References
 This article incorporates text from a publication now in the public domain: Palgrave, Robert Harry Inglis (1908). Dictionary of political economy. Macmillan.

External links
 

1830 births
1881 deaths